Life as We Know It or Life as We Knew It may refer to:

Life, as we know it on Earth, as described using standard biochemistry
Life as We Know It (film), a 2010 romantic comedy film directed by Greg Berlanti
Life as We Know It (TV series), a 2004 American television drama
Life as We Know It (REO Speedwagon album), 1987
Life as We Know It (Lonestar album), 2013, or the title track
Life as We Know It (EP), by American Alternative rock band Wild Colonials
"Life as We Knew It" (song), 1989 single by Kathy Mattea
Life as We Knew It (novel), science fiction novel by Susan Beth Pfeffer

See also
Life as we don't know it, hypothetical types of biochemistry possibly present elsewhere in the Universe